The 1984–85 National Football League was the 54th staging of the National Football League (NFL), an annual Gaelic football tournament for the Gaelic Athletic Association county teams of Ireland.

Monaghan won their first and only national title with a win over Armagh in the final.

Format 

This was the final year of the NFL in its present format before a move to a three division league for the 1985–86 NFL.

Divisions
 Division One: 8 teams
 Division Two: 8 teams
 Division Three: 8 teams. 
 Division Four: 8 teams.

Round-robin format
Each team played every other team in its division (or group where the division is split) once, either home or away.

Points awarded
2 points were awarded for a win and 1 for a draw.

Titles
Teams in all four divisions competed for the National Football League title.

Knockout stage qualifiers
 Division One: top 4 teams
 Division Two: top 2 teams
 Division Three:  top team 
 Division Four:  top team

Knockout phase structure
In the quarter-finals, the match-ups were as follows:
 Quarter-final 1: First-placed team in Division One v First-placed team in Division Four
 Quarter-final 2: Second-placed team in Division One v First-placed team in Division Three 
 Quarter-final 3: Third-placed team in Division One v Second-placed team in Division Two
 Quarter-final 4: Fourth-placed team in Division One v First-placed team in Division Two
The semi-final match-ups are:
 Semi-final 1: Winner Quarter-final 1 v Winner Quarter-final 4
 Semi-final 2: Winner Quarter-final 2 v Winner Quarter-final 3

The final match-up is: Winner Semi-final 1 v Winner Semi-final 2.

Promotion and relegation

When the NFL was played, relegation was to be as follows:

 Division One: bottom 2 teams demoted to Division Two
 Division Two: top 2 teams promoted to Division One. Bottom 2 teams demoted to Division Three.
 Division Three: top 2 teams promoted to Division Two. Bottom 2 teams demoted to Division Four.
 Division Four: top 2 teams promoted to Division Three.

The change in format agreed in advance of the 1985–86 NFL meant that promotion and relegation was as follows:

 Division One: bottom 2 teams demoted to Division Two
 Division Two: top 2 teams promoted to Division One. Bottom 2 teams demoted to Division Three.
 Division Three: top 2 teams promoted to Division Two. 
 Division Four: top 2 teams promoted to Division Three.

Separation of teams on equal points

In the event that teams finish on equal points, then a play-off will be used to determine group placings if necessary, i.e. where to decide relegation places or quarter-finalists.

League Tables

Division One

Division Two

Play-Offs

Table

Division Three

Play-Offs

This result was to relegate Wicklow to Division Four of the 1985–86 NFL. The play-off turned out to be redundant because of the restructure to the league, and both teams were in Division Three of the 1985–86 NFL.

Table

Division Four

Knockout stages

Quarter-finals

Semi-finals

Finals

References

External links

National Football League
National Football League
National Football League (Ireland) seasons